The Outer View is an album by George Russell originally released on Riverside in 1962. The album contains performances by Russell with Garnett Brown, Paul Plummer, Don Ellis, Steve Swallow, and Pete La Roca and features the recording debut of vocalist Sheila Jordan on one track. The Allmusic review by Scott Yanow states that "Composer George Russell's early-'60s Riverside recordings are among his most accessible. For this set Russell and his very impressive sextet are challenged by the complex material".

Track listing
All compositions by George Russell except as indicated
 "Au Privave" (Charlie Parker) - 6:21  
 "Zig-Zag" (Carla Bley) - 4:03  
 "The Outer View" - 10:03  
 "The Outer View" [alternate take] - 9:26 Bonus track on CD reissue 
 "You Are My Sunshine" (Jimmie Davis, Charles Mitchell) - 11:51  
 "D.C. Divertimento" - 9:14  
Recorded August 27, 1962 in NYC

Personnel
George Russell: piano, arranger, conductor
Don Ellis: trumpet
Garnett Brown: trombone
Paul Plummer: tenor saxophone
Steve Swallow: bass
Pete La Roca: drums
Sheila Jordan: vocals on "You Are My Sunshine"

References

1962 albums
George Russell (composer) albums
Riverside Records albums
Albums produced by Orrin Keepnews
Albums conducted by George Russell (composer)
Albums arranged by George Russell (composer)